Dolni Dabnik is a town in Pleven Province in the Danubian Plain of central northern Bulgaria. It is the administrative centre of Dolni Dabnik municipality and lies to the west of the city of Pleven. As of December 2009, the town has a population of 4,761 inhabitants.

Dolni Dabnik was first mentioned in 1430 and is known for its oil fields, some of the few in Bulgaria. Besides oil extraction, the locals are mainly occupied in agriculture.

Notable natives include Bulgaria international footballer Ivaylo Petkov (b. 1975), artist Ilia Beshkov (1901–1958) and politician Ventsislav Varbanov (b. 1962).

The name "Dolni Dabnik" literally means "lower oak place", in contrast to the neighbouring village of Gorni Dabnik ("higher oak place").

Honour
Dabnik Peak on Graham Land in Antarctica is named after Dolni Dabnik.

References

External links
 Dolni Dabnik municipality at Domino.bg  
 Dolni Dabnik Professional High School of Agriculture website 

Towns in Bulgaria
Populated places in Pleven Province